Caribicus anelpistus, the Altagracia giant galliwasp, is a possibly extinct species of lizard of the Diploglossidae family endemic to the Dominican Republic on the Caribbean island of Hispaniola.

Taxonomy
Along with the other members of its genus, it was formerly classified in the genus Celestus.

Conservation
Due to habitat loss and small Indian mongoose predation, it is considered critically endangered, if not extinct. Known only from the holotype, it has not been seen since 1977 in San Cristobal Province, though a giant galliwasp sighted in the vicinity of Jarabacoa in 2004 may be this species.

References

Caribicus
Reptiles described in 1979
Reptiles of the Dominican Republic
Endemic fauna of the Dominican Republic
Species known from a single specimen